Snafu or SNAFU may refer to:

Military

 SNAFU ("Situation Normal: All Fucked/Fouled Up"), a slang expression of US military origin
 Merriell Shelton (1922–1993), nicknamed "Snafu", a US Marine portrayed in the 2010 TV miniseries The Pacific
 Private Snafu, a character from US World War II instructional cartoons
 SNAFU Principle, "Communication is only possible between equals"
 , a Douglas C-47 Skytrain airplane in operation during World War II

Arts and entertainment

Music
 Snafu (band), a 1970s English rhythm and blues band
 Snafu (Snafu album), 1973
 Snafu (Potty Mouth album), 2019
 Snafu, an album by East of Eden, 1970
 "Snafu", a song by Izzy Stradlin from Like a Dog, 2005
 "Snafu", a song by Yusef Lateef from Eastern Sounds, 1961
 "S.N.A.F.U.", a song by Vanilla Ice from Hard to Swallow, 1998

Other media
 "Snafu" (Agent Carter), a television episode
 Snafu (film), a 1945 American comedy film starring Robert Benchley
 Snafu (magazine), a 1950s Marvel Comics satirical comic book
 Snafu (video game), a 1981 game for Intellivision
 Snafu Comics, a webcomics site
 SNAFU Con, an annual anime convention in Nevada, US
 Screwball Scramble, or Snafu, a toy
 My Youth Romantic Comedy Is Wrong, As I Expected, a light novel series & anime, often displayed as SNAFU

Places
 Snafu Lake, Yukon, Canada

See also
 Snafu 10-31-'91, an album by the Radiators, 1992